Chrisman is a city in Ross Township, Edgar County, Illinois, United States. The population was 1,312 at the 2020 census.

Geography

Chrisman is located on U.S. Route 150 less than a mile north of its intersection with U.S. Route 36.  Two railroad lines intersect in Chrisman, both operated by CSX Transportation.

Demographics
As of the 2020 census there were 1,312 people, 610 households, and 405 families residing in the city. The racial makeup of the city was 93.52% White, 0.61% African American, 0.15% Native American, 0.46% Asian, 1.07% from other races, and 4.19% from two or more races. Hispanic or Latino of any race were 1.52% of the population.

There were 610 households, out of which 65.74% had children under the age of 18 living with them, 61.48% were married couples living together, 3.77% had a female householder with no husband present, and 33.61% were non-families. 27.87% of all households were made up of individuals, and 15.08% had someone living alone who was 65 years of age or older. The average household size was 3.14 and the average family size was 2.49.

The city's age distribution consisted of 25.9% under the age of 18, 5.5% from 18 to 24, 23.4% from 25 to 44, 23.9% from 45 to 64, and 21.3% who were 65 years of age or older. The median age was 37.8 years. For every 100 females, there were 91.8 males. For every 100 females age 18 and over, there were 81.3 males.

The median income for a household in the city was $51,042, and the median income for a family was $70,234. Males had a median income of $46,875 versus $30,529 for females. The per capita income for the city was $26,336. About 6.7% of families and 8.5% of the population were below the poverty line, including 6.1% of those under age 18 and 9.3% of those age 65 or over.

Notable person
 Harry Woodyard, Illinois state legislator, lived in Chrisman.

References

External links
 

Cities in Illinois
Cities in Edgar County, Illinois